Mario Nigel Harvey (born August 10, 1987) is an American football linebacker who is currently a free agent. He was signed by the Pittsburgh Steelers as an undrafted free agent in 2011. He also played for the Indianapolis Colts and New York Jets, and played college football for Marshall University.

Professional career

New York Jets
Harvey was signed to the New York Jets' practice squad on December 16, 2014. He signed a reserve/future contract with the team on December 30, 2014. Harvey was released on May 8, 2015.

References

External links
Indianapolis Colts bio
Marshall Thundering Herd bio

1987 births
Living people
People from Forsyth, Georgia
Players of American football from Georgia (U.S. state)
American football fullbacks
American football linebackers
Marshall Thundering Herd football players
Pittsburgh Steelers players
Indianapolis Colts players
New York Jets players